Salamaua Rural LLG is a local-level government (LLG) of Morobe Province, Papua New Guinea.

Wards
01. Hote
02. Yemly
03. Bobodum
04. Selebob
05. Kamiatam (Iwal language speakers)
06. Mubo (Iwal language speakers)
07. Lababia (Kala language speakers)
08. Salus (Iwal language speakers)
09. Buansing (Iwal language speakers)
10. Laukanu (Kala language and Iwal language speakers)
11. Laugui (Kala language and Iwal language speakers)
12. Keila (Kala language speakers)
13. Asini
14. Buakap
15. Lutu Busama
16. Awasa Busama
17. Wabubu

References

Local-level governments of Morobe Province